Marinovka is an air base of the Russian Air Force as part of the 4th Air and Air Defence Forces Army, Southern Military District.

The base is home to the 11th Composite Aviation Regiment (11th SAP) which has two squadrons of Sukhoi Su-24M/MR (NATO: Fencer-D/E)

The base was home to the :
 168th Guards Bomber Aviation Regiment between 1991 and 1992.

References

External links 
 http://www.ww2.dk/new/air%20force/regiment/iap/767iap.htm 767th Fighter Aviation Regiment to 1975
 296th Fighter-Bomber Aviation Regiment, 105th Bomber Aviation Division, arrived from Grossenhain, Germany, in March 1993, disbanded June 1998. http://www.ww2.dk/new/air%20force/regiment/shap/296apib.htm

Airports in Volgograd Oblast
Russian Air Force bases